Melba may refer to:

 Dame Nellie Melba (1861–1931), Australian soprano opera singer
 Melba (film), a 1953 musical biopic drama film about Nellie Melba
 Melba (miniseries), a 1988 Australian mini series about Nellie Melba
 Melba Montgomery (born 1938), country music singer
 Melba Moore (born 1945), American R&B singer and actress
 Melba (1976 album)
 Melba (1978 album)
 Melba (TV series), a short-lived television series that starred Melba Moore
 Melba Roy Mouton (died 1990), American NASA scientist
 Melba (apple)
 Melba (beetle), a genus of insects in the family Staphylinidae

Things named after Nellie Melba

 Peach Melba, a dessert
 Melba toast, a dry, thin, crisp toast often served with soup
 Melba, Australian Capital Territory, a suburb of Canberra, Australia
 Melba Gully State Park, an environmentally significant area of the Otway Ranges
 Melba Conservatorium Victoria, a music school associated with Victoria University

Other uses 
 Melba, Idaho, a small town in the United States
 Melba, the name of a monster from the show Ultraman Tiga